Kempraten railway station is a railway station in Switzerland, situated near the village of Kempraten in the municipality of Rapperswil-Jona. The station is located on the Lake Zurich right bank railway line and is one of four active railway stations in  Rapperswil-Jona (the others being ,  and ).

Service

Train 
The station is served by the S7 S-Bahn service of Zurich S-Bahn, operated by Swiss Federal Railways. Summary of S-Bahn service:

 Zürich S-Bahn:

Bus 
A bus stop (Kempraten, Bahnhof) exists within walking distance to the railway station. This bus stop is served by Verkehrsbetriebe Zürichsee und Oberland (VZO) line 885 and line 994 of Stadtbus Rapperswil-Jona (also operated by VZO). Bus services are as follows:

References

External links 
 
 

Kempraten
Kempraten